The Episcopal Diocese of South Dakota is a diocese of the Episcopal Church with jurisdiction over the state of South Dakota.

History 
The diocese was created in 1871 at the Missionary District of Niobrara. It adopted the name Missionary District of South Dakota in 1884. William Hobart Hare was consecrated as Missionary Bishop in 1873, and full Bishop and the district concentrated its efforts on Native Americans. The original boundaries of the district "covered a territory north of the Niobrara River and west of the Missouri, all the way to the Rockies." The Missionary District became the Diocese of South Dakota in 1971, at which time there were 18 parishes, 24 mission congregations, 90 churches & chapels in the Niobrara Deanery, and 4 Episcopal schools.

Structure and membership
The diocese is composed of 76 member congregations in South Dakota, two in Nebraska and one in Minnesota, organized geographically into seven deaneries.

The diocese is made up of seven geographical deaneries: Black Hills (10 churches), Pine Ridge (7), Rosebud (15), Central (7), Northwest (17), Northeast (10) and Eastern (12). There is one church located in Minnesota, St. John’s in Browns Valley, part of the Northeast Deanery, and two in Nebraska, Blessed Redeemer, in Howe Creek and Our Most Merciful Savior, in Santee. Its cathedral, Calvary Cathedral, is located in Sioux Falls.

The Diocese of South Dakota has a multicultural membership and history. It has a special relationship with its Native American population. Approximately half of the 12,000 baptized Episcopalians in South Dakota are either Dakota or Lakota Sioux. The diocese also includes two congregations composed of Sudanese immigrants in Sioux Falls.

List of bishops
The bishops of South Dakota have been:
William Hobart Hare, Missionary Bishop from (1873–1883), full Bishop (1883–1909)* Frederick Foote Johnson, assisting bishop (1905–1909)
 Frederick Foote Johnson, (1910–1911)
 George Biller, Jr. (1912–1915)
 Hugh L. Burleson (1916–1931)* William P. Remington, suffragan (1918–1922)* W. Blair Roberts, suffragan (1922–1931)
 W. Blair Roberts, (1931–1954)* Conrad H. Gesner, coadjutor (1945–1954)
 Conrad H. Gesner, (1954–1970)* Lyman C. Ogilby, coadjutor (1964–1970)
 Walter H. Jones (1970–1983)* Harold S. Jones, suffragan (1972–1976)(Note: Harold S. Jones was the first Native American bishop in the Episcopal Church)
 Craig B. Anderson, (1984–1992)
 Creighton Leland Robertson, (1994–2009),
 John T. Tarrant,  (2009–2019)
Jonathan H. Folts, (2019-present)

Historic churches

Diocesan churches listed on the National Register of Historic Places include:

 Church of Our Most Merciful Saviour, Santee, Nebraska
 Emmanuel Episcopal Church (Rapid City, South Dakota)
 Holy Fellowship Episcopal Church (Greenwood, South Dakota)
 St. Andrew's Episcopal Church (Scotland, South Dakota)

See also

 List of Succession of Bishops for the Episcopal Church, USA

References

External links
Episcopal Diocese of South Dakota
Calvary Cathedral
The Episcopal Church
Journal of the Annual Convocation, Missionary District of South Dakota

South Dakota
Diocese
Religious organizations established in 1883
Anglican dioceses established in the 19th century
Province 6 of the Episcopal Church (United States)